Obio Akpa is a town located in the northeast part of the Oruk Anam Local Government Area. It is as well one among the nine administrative areas/districts known as Obio Akpa Clan both in the region of Akwa Ibom State, south south Nigeria

History 

Obio Akpa is a populated area in the Oruk Anam and it is also the gateway between Abak LGA and the Oruk Anam LGA The area is naturally rich in its crude oil and palm oil production, as in land population and academics the area, the Akwa Ibom State University (Aksuni) Campus(2) is situated within the area. Including public primary and secondary schools.

Subdivision

References 

Towns in Oruk Anam
Populated places in Akwa Ibom State